Hoseynabad-e Saravi (also Romanized as Ḩoseynābād-e Sārav’ī; also known as Ḩoseynābād) is a village in Ahmadabad Rural District, in the Central District of Firuzabad County, Fars Province, Iran. At the 2006 census, its population was 126, in 28 families.

References 

Populated places in Firuzabad County